Tripoli (Trípoli, formerly , Trípolis; earlier  Tripolitsá) is a city in the central part of the Peloponnese, in Greece. It is the capital of the Peloponnese region as well as of the regional unit of Arcadia. The homonym municipality has around 47,000 inhabitants.

Etymology

In the Middle Ages the place was known as Drobolitsa, Droboltsá, or Dorboglitza, either from the Greek Hydropolitsa, 'Water City' or perhaps from the South Slavic for 'Plain of Oaks'. The association made by 18th- and 19th-century scholars with the idea of the "three cities" (Τρίπολις, τρεις πόλεις "three cities": variously Callia, Dipoena and Nonacris, mentioned by Pausanias without geographical context, or Tegea, Mantineia and Pallantium, or Mouchli, Tegea and Mantineia or Nestani, Mouchli and Thana), were considered paretymologies by G.C. Miles. An Italian geographical atlas of 1687 notes the fort of Goriza e Mandi et Dorbogliza; a subsequent Italian geographical dictionary of 1827 attributes the name Dorbogliza to the ruins of Mantineia (Mandi) and states that it is located north of Tripolizza.

The Ottoman Turks referred to the town and the district as Tripoliçe.

History

In spring 1770 during a Greek uprising known as Orlov Revolt, the revolutionary armies were halted out of Tripolitsa. In retaliation for the Greek uprising, Albanian mercenaries of the Ottomans slaughtered 3,000 Greeks in a few hours upon entering the city. Total massacre and destruction of the city was avoided after intervention of Osman bey, leader of the Albanian mercenaries.

Before the Greek War of Independence, under the Ottoman name of "Tripoliçe", it was one of the Ottoman administrative centers in the Peloponnese (the Morea Eyalet, often called "pashalik of Tripolitsa") and had large Muslim and Jewish populations. Tripolis was one of the main targets of the Greek insurgents in the Greek War of Independence, who stormed it on 17 October 1821, following the bloody siege of Tripolitsa, and exterminated the Muslim and Jewish populations.

Ibrahim Pasha retook the city on June 22, 1825, after it had been abandoned by the Greeks. Before he evacuated the Peloponnese in early 1828, he destroyed the city and tore down its walls.

After the independent Greek state was established in 1830, the old Ottoman buildings of Tripolizza, such as the walls, were completely destroyed or demolished.

Tripoli was renamed and rebuilt and was developed as one of the main cities of the Kingdom of Greece, serving as the capital of the Arcadia district. During the 19th and the 20th centuries the city emerged to be the administrative, economic, commercial and transportation center of central and south Peloponnese.

Geography and climate
The city of Tripolis has a mediterranean climate (Köppen: Csa). Ιt is in the center of the Peloponnese, at the western border of a large basin (a polje at about 650 m in altitude, a length of ca. 30 km and a width between 12,5 and 2,5 km). The city is today the capital of the regional unit Arcadia (residents, city alone, ca. 30 000, district with hinterland ca. 47500, 2011 Greek census). At its west the city borders the thickly wooded mountain-area “Mainalo”. The Tripoli Basin has gradually been rainwater regulated (mainly after 1945 ) and turned into farmland. In the southwest floods, which appear in the basin occasionally after rainy winters, as in 2003, formed the temporary Lake Taka. This lake was regulated by a new pond, to retain water for irrigation.

Because of its inland location and high altitude, Tripolis has a transitional mediterranean/continental climate with hot dry summers and cold winters. Summer temperatures can exceed  and in winter temperatures below  have been observed. Snow or sleet can occur several times between late October and early April.

Its main plazas are aligned with the main street and with a highway linking to Pyrgos and Patras. One of them is named Kennedy, the other is named Georgiou B' (George II). The southern part has its main street named Washington. The main section of the city is enclosed around the castle walls that were built during the Ottoman occupation of Greece. An industrial park has been built in the southwest.

Surrounding area and geology 

In the large Tripoli Basin and in vast parts of the wider geological formations of the Arcadian Highland tectonics in the dominant carbonate rock "Tripoliza" of the Peloponnese developed a special topography: There are several plains, "intra mountainous basins", even "closed basins": Besides small basins, there are the Tripoli-Basin, the "Argon Pedion" (an almost separated side basin in the northeast of Tripoli), the Basin of Levidi and the Basin of Vlacherna Arcadia/Hotoussa/Kandila).

The peculiarity of all plains and basins in Arcadia is the coincidence with intensive karstification: Water seeps into the underground, rather than eroding and draining the topography by surface waterways. All drainage runs through ponors (in Greek: καταβόθρες) and subterranean waterways. There are 45 ponors in the above named basins. There are 7 ponors around Lake Taka. When winter rains are heavy, the ground is flooded or temporary lakes form, even today, as drainage through ponors is often slow which causes land cultivation delays.

Municipality

The municipality of Tripoli was formed at the 2011 local government reform by merging these 8 former municipalities, that became municipal units:
Falanthos
Korythio
Levidi
Mantineia
Skiritida
Tegea
Tripoli
Valtetsi

The municipality has an area of 1,475.805 km2, the municipal unit 119.287 km2.

Subdivisions
The municipal unit of Tripoli is subdivided into these communities:
Agios Vasileios
Agios Konstantinos
Evandro
Makri
Merkovouni
Pallantio
Pelagos
Perthori
Skopi
Thanas
Tripoli

Education
Tripoli is the flagship campus of the University of the Peloponnese, founded in 2000. 

UoP Tripoli is the location of the School of Economy, Management and Informatics, composed of the Department of Economics and the Department of Informatics and Telecommunications.

Transportation

Because it is at the centre of the Peloponnese, Tripolis is a transportation hub. Corinth is  NE, Pyrgos  E, Patras  NW, Kalamata  SW, and Sparti  S.

Tripoli is mainly accessed from Athens and the rest of Greece through the Corinth-Tripoli-Kalamata motorway, known as the Moreas Motorway (A7). An alternative route is the GR-7 which used to be the main highway to Tripoli before the construction of the motorway. The city is also accessed by GR-74 and GR-76 from Pyrgos and by GR-39 from Sparta.

Tripoli is served by the metre gauge railway line from Corinth to Kalamata of the Hellenic Railways Organisation (OSE). The line was renovated and passenger services to Árgos and Corinth, which had been suspended for a few years, were reinstated in 2009.  However, in December 2010 services ceased again due to the general suspension of railway services in the Peloponnese.

Military
Tripoli is home to the two largest Armed Forces bootcamps in Greece, one operated by the Hellenic Army and one by the Hellenic Air Force: the 251st Army Training Battalion and the 124th Basic Training Wing.

Sports
Tripoli hosts three sport clubs with presence in the higher national divisions in Greek football and basketball. These clubs are shown below.

In popular culture
The siege of Tripolitsa was made famous in the folk (Δημοτικό) song "40 παλικάρια από την Λιβαδειά" (Forty lads from Libadeia)

Historical population

Notable people

 Theodoros Kolokotronis (3 April 1770 – 4 February 1843), general and pre-eminent leader of the Greek War of Independence
 Epameinontas Deligeorgis (1829-1879), Prime Minister of Greece
 Konstantinos Georgakopoulos (1890–1978), lawyer and politician, Prime Minister of Greece
 Kostas Karyotakis (1896–1928), poet
 Ioannis Kossos, sculptor
 Yiannis Kouros (1956), ultramarathon runner
 Konstantinos Manetas (1879–1960), general and politician
 Theodoros Manetas (1881–1947), general and politician
 Alexandros Papanastasiou (1876–1936), politician and sociologist, Prime Minister of Greece
 Dr. Giorgos Peponis, medical practitioner, sports administrator and former captain of the Australian Rugby League team was born in the city in 1953
 Petros Tatoulis (1953), politician
 Semni Karouzou (1897-1994), archaeologist and curator

International relations

Twin towns — sister cities
Tripoli, Greece is twinned with:
 Peine, Germany
 Arcadia, California, United States

Gallery

References

External links

 Mariolakos, Geomythological Sites in Arcadia in Greek
 http://arcadia.ceid.upatras.gr/arkadia/places/trip/tripoli.htm  (in Greek)
 Weather in Tripoli (in Greek)
 GTP – Tripoli
 GTP – Municipality of Tripoli

 
Municipalities of Peloponnese (region)
Populated places in Arcadia, Peloponnese
Greek prefectural capitals
Greek regional capitals